The IMA Journal of Mathematical Control and Information is published by Oxford University Press on behalf of the Institute of Mathematics and its Applications. The Journal publishes articles in control and information theory which aim to develop solutions for unsolved problems in the field.

External links 
 Journal homepage
 Submission website
 Institute of Mathematics and its Applications

References 

Mathematics journals
Oxford University Press academic journals